The Province of La Spezia (Ligurian: Provinsa dea Spèza) is a province in the Liguria region of Italy. Its capital is the city of La Spezia.

There are 32 communes in the province (source: Italian institute of statistics Istat

In the province of La Spezia are the Cinque Terre, Portovenere and the Islands (Palmaria, Tino and Tinetto), a UNESCO World Heritage Site. Also more in this area are the villages of Brugnato, Montemarcello, Tellaro and Varese Ligure, which were included in the list of the most beautiful villages in Italy. In addition, the Province of La Spezia is one of the institutions awarded with the Gold Medal for Military Valour for the sacrifices of its people and its activities in the partisan struggle during the Second World War.

Main municipalities

Transportation

Two main lines cross the territory: the "Tirrenica" line linking the province to Genoa and Rome, and the "Pontremolese" line that goes in the direction of Parma and Milan/Venice. There are regular trains that connect the province with other italian cities, including Turin, Palermo and Ventimiglia.

In the province there is the airport of Luni, which is used only by general aviation. The nearest airports with international and intercontinental connections are: the airport Cristoforo Colombo of Genova, Firenze-Pisa airport, and Milan Malpensa airport.

There are two motorways that cross the territory. The A12 motorway which connects the province with Genoa and Livorno, and the A15 motorway, which connects La Spezia to Parma.

Among the road development projects that are the subject of debate, they are mentioned: completion of the Aurelia Variation; interconnection of Via XXV aprile, in the Piana di Arcola, with the Aurelia; functional completion and regulatory adaptation of the Fornola junction (entrance in the direction of La Spezia and exit in the direction of Santo Stefano); bypass Romito (link road that from the Sp331 bypasses the town, 'emerging' from the cemetery); the Santo Stefano-Ceparana bridge; the doubling of the Cisa state road between Santo Stefano and Sarzana; Muggiano-Ressora link road, which bypasses the town of San Terenzo; new infrastructure to the artisan urban plan of Tavolara (Sarzana); completion tunnel between the Gulf and Val di Vara, with exit at Piano di Valeriano.

Popular culture 
The fictional city of Portorosso in the 2021 animated film Luca was inspired by several towns in the province of La Spezia, such as Vernazza and Riomaggiore. The Pixar animation team visited Cinque Terre as well as Tellaro and Porto Venere for inspiration for the film.

References

External links
Official website (in Italian)
"Tuttifrutti" in the Province of La Spezia
Official page of tourism in Liguria
Tuttitalia 

 
La Spezia